Special Mission Lady Chaplin (also known as Operation Lady Chaplin) is a 1966 Italian-French-Spanish Eurospy film directed by Alberto De Martino and Sergio Grieco. It is the third and last of the Secret Agent 077 film series starring Ken Clark as 077 and Daniela Bianchi as fashion expert and professional killer Lady Arabella Chaplin. Bianchi reprised her role as Arabella in Your Turn to Die (1967). The film was shot in New York City, London, Madrid, Rome, and Paris.

Plot
CIA Secret Agent 077 Dick Malloy (Jack Clifton in the German release) is sent to Madrid when someone wishes to sell a dog tag apparently recovered from the sunken American nuclear submarine USS Thresher. Once the item is identified as a genuine article, the man selling the information is killed before he can reveal how he acquired the dog tag from the ocean floor. Malloy and his boss Heston interview the Howard Hughes type marine salvage multi-millionaire Zoltan in order to determine whether the wreck of the submarine could be accessed. Zoltan denies it is possible but Heston and Malloy do not believe Zoltan is telling the truth.

Using an advanced bathysphere, Malloy travels to the site of the remains of the Thresher and discovers that the 16 Polaris missiles with nuclear warheads carried by the submarine are missing.

Cast 
 Ken Clark as Dick Malloy 
 Daniela Bianchi as Lady Arabella Chaplin 
 Helga Liné as Hilde
 Jacques Bergerac as Kobre Zoltan
 Mabel Karr as Jacqueline
 Alfredo Mayo as Sir Hillary
 Philippe Hersent as Heston
 Ida Galli as Constance Day  
 Tomás Blanco as Inspector Soler

Release
Special Mission Lady Chaplin was released in Italy on August 12, 1966. It was released in France on June 18, 1967.

References

External links
 

1966 films
Italian spy thriller films
1960s spy thriller films
1960s Italian-language films
Films directed by Alberto De Martino
French spy thriller films
Spanish spy thriller films
Films directed by Sergio Grieco
Films about nuclear war and weapons
Films scored by Bruno Nicolai
1960s parody films
1966 comedy films
Films shot in New York City
Films shot in London
1960s Italian films
1960s French films